Huaxi is a town in Yuxi, southern Yunnan Province, Southwest China. It is under the administration of Huaning County. , it has two residential communities and four villages under its administration. It is one of the largest orange producers in Yunnan
.

References

Township-level divisions of Yuxi
Huaning County
Towns of Yunnan